Disk Utility is a system utility for performing disk and disk volume-related tasks on the macOS operating system by Apple Inc.

Functions
The functions currently supported by Disk Utility include:
 Creation, conversion, backup, compression, and encryption of logical volume images from a wide range of formats read by Disk Utility to .dmg or, for CD/DVD images, .cdr
 Mounting, unmounting and ejecting disk volumes (including both hard disks, removable media, and disk volume images)
 Enabling or disabling journaling
 Verifying a disk's integrity, and repairing it if the disk is damaged (this will work for both Mac compatible format partitions and for FAT32 partitions with Microsoft Windows installed)
 Erasing, formatting, partitioning, and cloning disks
 Secure deletion of free space or disk using a "zero out" data, a 7-pass DOD 5220-22 M standard, or a 35-pass Gutmann algorithm
 Adding or changing partition table between Apple Partition Map, GUID Partition Table, and master boot record (MBR)
 Restoring volumes from Apple Software Restore (ASR) images
 Checking the S.M.A.R.T. status of a hard disk

Disk Utility functions may also be accessed from the macOS command line with the diskutil and hdiutil commands. It is also possible to create and manage RAM disk images by using hdiutil and diskutil in terminal.

History
In the classic Mac OS, similar functionality to the verification features of Disk Utility could be found in the Disk First Aid application. Another application called Drive Setup was used for drive formatting and partitioning and the application Disk Copy was used for working with disk images.

Before Mac OS X Panther, the functionality of Disk Utility was spread across two applications: Disk Copy and Disk Utility. Disk Copy was used for creating and mounting disk image files whereas Disk Utility was used for formatting, partitioning, verifying, and repairing file structures. The ability to "zero" all data (multi-pass formatting) on a disk was not added until Mac OS X 10.2.3. Further changes introduced in Mac OS X Tiger, specifically version 10.4.3, allowed Disk Utility to be used to verify the file structure of the current boot drive. Mac OS X Leopard added the ability to create, resize, and delete disk partitions without erasing them, a feature known as live partitioning. In OS X El Capitan, Disk Utility has a different user interface and lost the abilities to repair permissions due to obsolescence, create and manage disks formatted as RAID, burn discs, and multi-pass format internal solid-state drives and encrypted external drives.

See also
 Apple Software Restore
 Logical Disk Manager
 Palimpsest Disk Utility
 GNU Parted
 diskpart
 fdisk
 cfdisk
 sfdisk

References

External links
 Online man page for diskutil
 Online man page for hdiutil

MacOS
Disk partitioning software
Hard disk software
Data erasure software
Backup software for macOS
MacOS archivers and compression-related utilities